War of the Worlds is a science fiction television series that ran for two seasons, from October 7, 1988 to May 14, 1990. The series is a sequel to the 1953 film The War of the Worlds, a loose adaptation of the 1898 novel of the same title by H. G. Wells, using the same war machine designs and often incorporating aspects from the film, radio adaptation, and the original novel into its mythology.

Though the original film's producer, George Pal, envisioned a TV series from the same film sometime in the 1970s, it was not until the late 1980s that a series was finally realized, this time by television producer Greg Strangis. The show was a part of the boom of first-run syndicated television series being produced at the time. It was later shown in reruns on the Sci Fi Channel.

The series was filmed in Toronto, Ontario, Canada.

Premise 
According to the series, rather than being killed outright by germs at the end of the 1953 film, the aliens had all slipped into a state of suspended animation. Their bodies were stored away in toxic waste drums and shipped to various disposal sites within the United States (ten such sites are known to exist in the country) and a widespread government cover-up combined with a condition dubbed “selective amnesia” has convinced most people that the invasion had never happened.

Although the original movie narration had explicitly stated that the aliens were Martians (even featuring artwork indicating an alien city on the planet Mars), since 1953 the concept of vastly intelligent life on Mars had lost plausibility. In the series, the aliens are revealed to actually be from Mor-Tax—a garden planet 40 light-years away in the Taurus constellation orbiting a dying sun.

Thirty-five years later, in 1988 (modern day when the series began), a terrorist group calling itself the People's Liberation Party accidentally irradiates the drums containing the aliens while raiding the dumpsite near Fort Jericho. The radiation destroys the bacteria that were keeping the aliens unconscious. Once free, the aliens take possession of the bodies of the six terrorists who overran the site. From there they use a series of human bodies and crudely adapted Earth technology to find means of appropriating the planet, both in removing humanity and developing a permanent means to inoculate themselves against the planet's indigenous bacteria. Their attempt to successfully make Earth into their new homeworld is imperative, for in roughly five years three million colonists from Mor-Tax are expected to arrive.

Plot

First season 
Opening narration (spoken in voice-over by Martin in character as Blackwood):

Along with other sci-fi/horror series that ran in syndication in the late 1980s (such as Friday the 13th: The Series and Freddy's Nightmares), War of the Worlds constantly pushed the “acceptable content” envelope, regularly featuring violence on par with the R-rated horror movies of the time. Gore is commonplace in the first season: dead aliens and their tossed-away hosts’ bodies melt in a grotesque puddle and the ruthless Mor-Taxans have no compunctions about torturing or mutilating any human who gets in their way. One of their trademark methods of murder would be gouged-out eyes courtesy of the third arm that would often burst out from their chest.

During the first season, the aliens are led by a triumvirate known as the Advocacy. They are a part of their society's ruling class, overseeing the invasion force on Earth while their leaders, the invisible and never heard Council, remain back on Mor-Tax. Outfitted throughout most of the season in contamination suits that pump coolant to counteract the killing heat of the radiation they need, they stay in their base of operation: a cavern in the Nevada desert, which is perfect due to the ambient radiation from atomic bomb tests. Due to the risks to their lives, they rarely venture into the outside world because without the Advocacy the lower classes would have no guidance and be useless.

Their goal is to pick up where they left off in 1953 by making way on Earth for the three million colonists heading in exodus from their dying world. Their major objective in order to accomplish this terraforming is to remove humanity from the planet. The aliens’ hatred of human beings goes beyond simple prejudice. Having come from a planet that can be compared to the Garden of Eden based on its description, the aliens see that humans do nothing but desecrate what they would call a paradise, and most importantly, a new home. Without humans in the way, they can restore the vegetation, and better replicate the conditions of their deceased world. To carry out a successful war, they seek out weapons (some of which are their own left behind from previous visitations), help amass their army, and engage in infiltration and all sorts of acts of warfare. But to make things more problematic, they must also find immunity against the germs that befell them in 1953.

The simplicity of the alien invasion storyline is countered in the first season by the addition of anomalous entities whose motives are only partially explained:

 Quinn: An alien trapped in a human host since the invasion of ’53, mysteriously immune to bacteria, and ready to play both of the major warring factions against each other for his own favor.
 The Qar’To: An unknown alien race represented by a synthetic lifeform sent to Earth, they want the Mor-Taxans dead and humanity preserved, but for sinister reasons.
 Project 9: A shadow government organization much like the Blackwood Project, but more interested in alien research than in resisting or countering the Mor-Taxan invasion plans.

A number of recurring allies are presented for the Blackwood team. Sylvia Van Buren (a character from the George Pal film reprised by the original actress, Ann Robinson), who was a colleague of Dr. Forrester, has since the end of the war developed the ability to sense the aliens and is prone to fairly accurate precognitive visions. The aliens’ scientific arsenal has little power over the supernatural powers of shaman Joseph Lonetree (whose presence is seemingly foreshadowed in the first episode). The team even makes friends with the remaining Grover's Mill militia of 1938 who had their own run-in with the aliens.

A recurring element in the series is the number three. This is an extension of the film, wherein the aliens’ physiology, technology and society are rooted in multiples of three: from their caste system (ruling class, soldiers, and scientists) to their bodies (three arms with three fingers), weaponry (in “The Resurrection”, they make bolas with three weighted ends), and even their mating cycle is every nine years (three times three years). The appearance of the number in some form is sprinkled throughout the season in reference to the aliens.

The episodes all had (often ironic) Biblical titles, such as "The Walls of Jericho", "To Heal the Leper", and "Among the Philistines".

“To Life Immortal” (too doe nakotae as it would be said in the aliens’ native tongue), a phrase by which the aliens seem to sum up their belief system, is a common exchange between aliens, as a pledge to their shared goal or as a battle cry before honorable self-sacrifice. It later became a popular catchphrase among the show's fans.

Second season 
Opening voice-over:

The creative team of Season 1 was replaced, bringing in Frank Mancuso, Jr., who was also busy producing Friday the 13th: The Series. Many aspects of the show were retooled, such as the title sequence and music, and much of the black humor and Biblical references were removed. Norton and Ironhorse, two major characters from the first season, are killed off in the season premiere and replaced by mercenary John Kincaid (Adrian Paul).

The modern-day setting of the first season shifted to a not-too-distant future of "Almost Tomorrow" where the world has since spiraled into a dismal state with its economy, environment, and government all beaten down. The antagonists of the first season are replaced by the Morthren, from Mothrai; while the first season aliens were said to be from the planet Mor-Tax, there is a half-hearted explanation for this change in the final episode. The Morthren exterminate all the aliens from the first season for their failure to eradicate humanity.

Whereas bacteria and radiation are constant problems for the aliens in the first season, the Morthren have quickly found a cure-all means for this by transmutating into human bodies. With this, they forwent the ability to possess human bodies, retaining only one human body. These bodies are, however, easily damaged; as seen in the series a single bullet wound is enough to cause the aliens' human form to break down, killing them. Their equivalent of body-swapping is a cloning machine that makes exact copies of someone, only differing in that the duplicates would be loyal to the Morthren cause and their existence tied to the original. Ironically, as sores are the telltale signs of alien possession in the first season, a lack of scars or any physical flaw was a telltale sign of a clone, as the Morthren are fixated with perfection. While the Eternal is their god, the Morthren are led by Malzor (played by Denis Forest, who had a large part in the Season 1 episode “Vengeance Is Mine”). Just under him was the scientist Mana (Catherine Disher, whose husband also played a major role in a Season 1 episode) with Ardix (Julian Richings who appeared briefly in “He Feedeth Among the Lillies”) as her assistant.

Meanwhile, with General Wilson missing, the Cottage destroyed, and two team members lost in battle, the remnants of the team, with mercenary Kincaid, seek shelter. They take up base in an underground hideout in the sewers.  Some of the characters experience shifts, such as Harrison carrying a gun, becoming more sullen and losing his more quirky personality traits. The friction between the militaristic Ironhorse and the other team members was not transferred with Kincaid, who got along well with everyone, who themselves became more militaristic in season 2. The show's theme of warfare between two races, and all the issues that come with it, was replaced by a theme of a bleak life on a desolate world, but with possible hope for the future.

Although the series was canceled after 14 episodes had been broadcast, six more episodes were completed. This also gave the production team the opportunity to create a finale, "The Obelisk", which offers a conclusive ending to the series as a whole.

Cast

Main cast 
An eclectic group is formed by the government to deal with the new alien threat, and the series follows their missions and adventures (and often failures) in fighting the aliens. The Blackwood Project, named after its central member, consists of the following:

 Dr. Harrison Blackwood (Jared Martin): Astrophysicist whose parents were killed in the 1953 invasion. He was adopted following the events of the film by Dr. Clayton Forrester and Blackwood's character is played very much to resemble Forrester down to his demeanor, dress, and even his speech and appearance. He is a pacifist and a vegetarian, and is often seen practicing many alternative health techniques such as yoga during the first season, but becomes grittier in the second.
 Dr. Suzanne McCullough (Lynda Mason Green): Microbiologist and single mother to Debi. She firmly embraces standard procedure in her work, which causes friction with Blackwood and his chaotic and eccentric work habits.
 Debi McCullough (Rachel Blanchard)
 Norton Drake (Philip Akin, season 1): A long-time friend of Harrison, he is a paraplegic computer genius who is granted mobility via a voice-activated wheelchair named Gertrude. He is often portrayed as being cool and laid back with a good sense of humor. In earlier episodes he had a pseudo-Caribbean accent; this was later dropped.
 Lt. Col. Paul Ironhorse (Richard Chaves, season 1): Military man. He is rather conservative and often clashes with the other members of the team, especially Blackwood who is his political and philosophical opposite.
 John Kincaid (Adrian Paul, season 2): Human resistance member
 Malzor (Denis Forest, season 2): Alien commander
 Mana (Catherine Disher, season 2): Alien scientist

Notable guest stars 
The first season featured some recognisable actors in the series. Aside from getting Ann Robinson to reprise her role as Sylvia van Buren from the film, the series also obtained John Colicos (from Battlestar Galactica and Star Trek) as rogue alien Quinn who, while only appearing twice, was no doubt intended to play an integral part of the series as it went on (the character's power-hungry nature and middleman status between two worlds is noticeably reminiscent of Colicos’ role as Count Baltar). The list of notable guests begins in the show's very start with John Vernon appearing in the first two episodes as General Wilson. Other guest stars throughout the series: Patrick Macnee, Greg Morris, Jeff Corey, John Ireland, Colm Feore, and James Hong.

The series was also the early working ground for future stars. Chris Potter made his acting debut in the second episode of season one. Singer Alannah Myles appears in the 20th episode of season one, which aired less than three weeks after the release of her platinum-certified eponymous debut album. Aside from exclusive season two star Adrian Paul (of Highlander fame), the second season also featured the first onscreen appearance of Mia Kirshner. The second season also gave more screentime to Rachel Blanchard, who only had minor play in the first season.  Julian Richings also makes regular appearances as Ardix, an alien scientist working under Mana.

Episodes

Season 1 (1988–89)

Note that three episodes ("The Walls of Jericho", "The Good Samaritan", and "Epiphany") are credited to pseudonyms based on the original film characters Clayton Forrester and Sylvia van Buren.  These were the first three regular episodes produced, during the 1988 Writers Guild of America strike, and the writers (possibly including series creator Greg Strangis) went uncredited to avoid being charged with strikebreaking.

Season 2 (1989–90)

Releases

Novelization 
A novelization of the pilot episode was written by J. M. Dillard. While following the same narrative structure of the episode, the book contains characters from the 1953 film and scenes not included in the final cut of the pilot; it also explores more deeply the aliens' political motivations, and emphasizes denial instead of the "selective amnesia" aspect of the plot.

Home media 
On November 1, 2005, Paramount Home Media Distribution released season 1 on DVD in Region 1.  The set's release coincided with the DVD re-release of the 1953 film from which the show was spawned (the updated version from Steven Spielberg being released on DVD later the same month). A common criticism of the DVDs has been the poor image quality; fans in particular also point out the omission of the alien hand animation from the opening credits that had been inexplicably removed from every episode. The set contains no special features. It does, however, allow the viewer to jump to a chapter, which are divided by act, including the opening and closing credits, but are not available via any menu. It also includes closed captioning, but these may not be entirely reliable as there are several clear errors - for example, it is inconsistent in how it spells the name of the aliens' homeworld, neither of which is the canonical spelling. By contrast, however, in a few episodes, the captioning refers to the Advocates by the name of their original host bodies from the pilot episode (i.e. Chambers, Urick, and Einhorn), even in the absence of the original actors.

The second and final season was released on October 26, 2010, nearly five years after the release of the first season.

In Region 2, Revelation Films has released both seasons on DVD in the UK.  Season 1 was released on April 30, 2012 and Season 2 was released on August 30, 2012.

On February 6, 2018, CBS Home Entertainment and Paramount Home Media Distribution released seasons 1 and 2 as a single package entitled War of the Worlds: The Complete Series on DVD.

References

External links 

 

1980s American science fiction television series
1990s American science fiction television series
1980s Canadian science fiction television series
1990s Canadian science fiction television series
1988 American television series debuts
1990 American television series debuts
1988 Canadian television series debuts
1990 Canadian television series endings
Alien invasions in television
First-run syndicated television programs in the United States
Television series by CBS Studios
Television shows filmed in Toronto
Live action television shows based on films
Television series about extraterrestrial life
Television series based on adaptations
Television shows based on novels
Television shows set in California
Television shows set in Nevada
Works based on The War of the Worlds
English-language television shows